Georgia's 12th congressional district is a congressional district in the U.S. state of Georgia. It is represented by Republican Rick Allen. The district's boundaries have been redrawn following the 2010 census, which granted an additional congressional seat to Georgia.  The first election using the new district boundaries (listed below) were the 2012 congressional elections.

The district covers portions of the eastern and southeastern parts of the state. It includes the cities of Augusta, Dublin, Douglas, and Statesboro.

Counties 
Columbia
Richmond
Burke
Jenkins
Screven
Emanuel
Treutlen
Laurens
Wheeler
Montgomery
Toombs
Candler
Bulloch
Effingham (Partial, see also )
Evans
Tattnall
Appling
Jeff Davis
Coffee

Former 
Chatham (Partial, see also )

Election results from presidential races

List of members representing the district

Election results

2012

2014

2016

2018

2020

2022

See also 
 Georgia's 3rd congressional district
 Georgia's congressional districts

References

Further reading

External links
 PDF map of Georgia's 12th district at nationalatlas.gov
 Georgia's 12th congressional district at GovTrack.us
U.S. Census data searchable by congressional district
Opensecrets.org Fundraising data from FEC reports
Analysis of district from Capitaleye.org
2006 results by county from CBSNews.com

12
Constituencies established in 2003
2003 establishments in Georgia (U.S. state)